The JK Building is the tallest building in downtown Belo Horizonte, Brazil, named for Juscelino Kubitschek, who was the mayor of Belo Horizonte and later president of Brazil.

Standing at 40 stories tall, the JK Building is the third tallest building in Brazil after the Itália Building (45 stories) and Mirante do Vale (51 stories), both in São Paulo. It was designed by Oscar Niemeyer in 1951, to work like a complete town. 13 kinds of apartments are found there (up to 3 or 4 bedrooms) and several kinds of people and families live there, too. Shops on the first floor, with access from the streets, provide inhabitants with everything they need without leaving the building.

The JK building succeeded Acaiaca Building (29 stories) as the tallest building in Belo Horizonte, and it still maintains this record.

See also
List of Oscar Niemeyer works

Residential buildings completed in 1951
Oscar Niemeyer buildings